Ovoo, oboo, or obo (Traditional Mongol: , "heap"; Chinese: 敖包 áobāo, lit. "magnificent bundle [i.e. shrine]") are sacred stone heaps used as altars or shrines in Mongolian folk religious practice and in the religion of other Mongolic peoples. They are usually made from rocks with wood.

Ovoos are often found at the top of mountains and in high places, like mountain passes. In modern times, some of them have developed into large and elaborate structures, becoming more like temples than simple altars. 
They serve mainly as sites for the worship of Heaven and lesser gods led by shamans and kins' elders, but also for Buddhist ceremonies.

In custom

When travelling, it is the custom to stop and circle an ovoo three times, moving clockwise, in order to have a safer journey. Usually, rocks are picked up from the ground and added to the pile. Also, one may leave offerings in the form of sweets, money, milk, or vodka. If one is in a hurry while traveling and does not have time to stop at an ovoo, honking of the horn while passing by the ovoo will suffice.

In ceremony

Ovoos are the site for Heaven worship ceremonies that typically take place at the end of summer. Worshippers place a tree branch or stick in the ovoo and tie a blue khadag, a ceremonial silk scarf symbolic of the open sky and the sky spirit  Tengri, or Tengger, to the branch. They then light a fire and make food offerings, followed by a ceremonial dance and prayers (worshippers sitting at the northwest side of the ovoo), and a feast with the food left over from the offering.

During Mongolia's communist period, ovoo worship was officially prohibited along with other forms of religion, but people still worshipped clandestinely.

Ovoos may have influenced or given birth to the Korean seonangdang.

A number of sums (districts) in Mongolia have the word Ovoo in their name:
 Bayan-Ovoo, Bayankhongor
 Bayan-Ovoo, Khentii
 Bayan-Ovoo, Ömnögovi
 Mandal-Ovoo, Ömnögovi
 Saikhan-Ovoo, Dundgovi
 Tsagaan-Ovoo, Dornod
 Bayan Obo, in Inner Mongolia

References

External links 

Religion in Mongolia
Mongolian culture
Artificial hills
Mongolian shamanism
Siberian shamanism
Place of ritual